Matthew Blandford (born April 16, 1985) is a Canadian curler currently residing in Cold Lake, Alberta. He is originally from Stephenville, Newfoundland and Labrador, and is a three-time Newfoundland and Labrador junior champion.

Career
Blandford started his curling career as a junior curler in Newfoundland and Labrador. He was the provincial junior champion three times, and represented Newfoundland and Labrador at the Canadian Junior Championships three times. He finished in tenth place in 2003, finished as the runner-up in 2004, and finished tied for fourth at the 2005. Blandford played at the Newfoundland and Labrador provincial men's championship as skip in 2006,eventually losing in a tie breaker . Blandford played at the Newfoundland and Labrador provincial men's championship as third under Dean Branton in 2009, but finished tied second to last. He skipped a team at the 2010 Newfoundland Tankard, and lost in a tiebreaker. He however beat the Brad Gushue rink in the round robin, making him the last skip (as of 2020) to beat Gushue at the Newfoundland Tankard. 

Blandford then moved to Alberta, and first played in the provincial championship in 2012. Blandford was eliminated in the knockout stages in the Alberta provincials in 2012 and 2013, but was able to qualify for the playoffs in the 2014 provincials through the B qualifier. He was defeated in the page playoffs by Kevin Martin, and was eliminated in the semifinal by Kevin Koe, finishing in third overall.

Blandford was invited to skip the Wade Scoffin rink for the 2016 Yukon Men's Curling Championship.

Personal life
Blandford works as an artificial lift technician at Imperial Oil. He went to high school at Booth Memorial High School, and attended university at the College of the North Atlantic.

References

External links
 

1985 births
Living people
Canadian male curlers
Curlers from Alberta
Curlers from Newfoundland and Labrador
People from Cold Lake, Alberta
People from Stephenville, Newfoundland and Labrador
21st-century Canadian people